Statistics of Football Clubs Association Championship for the 1925–26 season.

Athens Football Clubs Association

Piraeus Football Clubs Association

Macedonia Football Clubs Association

References

External links
Rsssf 1925–26 championship

 

Panhellenic Championship seasons
1925–26 in Greek football
1925–26 domestic association football leagues